Mimozotale trivittata is a species of beetle in the family Cerambycidae. It was described by Pic in 1931. It is known from Vietnam.

References

Desmiphorini
Beetles described in 1931